HDMS Hvidbjørnen (Hvidbjørnen is older Danish for polar bear) is a  belonging to the Royal Danish Navy.

Service 

Hvidbjørnen served as a platform for Commander Danish Task Group from 1998 to 2002, whereafter her sister ship  assumed the role.

During a patrol in the waters of the Faroe Islands, the French trawler Bruix was suspected of illegal fishing. When approached by Hvidbjørnen the French trawler refused to let an inspection team aboard and started to sail towards the territorial border. During the chase the two ships collided (no persons injured).

Hvidbjørnen and  participated with Danish air elements in sovereignty and Search and Rescue exercises off Greenland's west coast in 2009.
The vessels patrol took them to the Nares Strait, close to Hans Island, the approaches to the Northwest Passage, and to Lancaster Sound.  In Lancaster Sound they joined in a Search and Rescue exercise with the Canadian Coast Guard vessel, CCGS Henry Larsen.

References

External links 

Thetis-class ocean patrol vessels
Ships built in Svendborg
1991 ships
Frigates of the Royal Danish Navy